Kanedaira  Bosai Dam is an earthfill dam located in Gifu Prefecture in Japan. The dam is used for flood control. The catchment area of the dam is 2.2 km2. The dam impounds about 4  ha of land when full and can store 412 thousand cubic meters of water. The construction of the dam was started on 1975 and completed in 1987.

References

Dams in Gifu Prefecture
1987 establishments in Japan